Leterrier is a surname. Notable people with the surname include:

 Catherine Leterrier (born 1942), French costume designer
 Eugène Leterrier (1843–1884), French librettist
 François Leterrier (1929–2020), French film director and actor
 Louis Leterrier (born 1973), French film director